Efraín Flores Mercado (born 6 February 1958) is a Mexican professional football manager.

Career
Flores was named coach during the mid Apertura 2007 tournament, taking over for José Manuel de la Torre. He has coached Atlas, Leon, Guadalajara and Pachuca.

Flores was the Interim Head coach of the Selección de fútbol de México (Mexico national team) for three games. In his first match with the Mexico national team, he was an assistant to Enrique Meza as they drew against world champions and No. 1 world ranking, Spain. This feat gained him very much attention and has renewed the pride and stature of the Mexico national team.

References

External links
 Efraín Flores' Statistics 

1958 births
Living people
Mexican football managers
Sportspeople from Zacatecas
People from Zacatecas
Atlas F.C. managers
Club León managers
C.D. Guadalajara managers
C.F. Pachuca managers
Mineros de Zacatecas managers
Mexico national football team managers
Mexican footballers

Association footballers not categorized by position